The Traitors is a 1962 British thriller film directed by Robert Tronson and starring Patrick Allen, Jacqueline Ellis, Zena Walker and James Maxwell.

Premise
A British agent and an American from NATO co-operate in an attempt to smash a communist spy ring. Following the discovery of a top secret microfilm after a plane crash, the two become embroiled in a complex web of treachery and double agents, before finally bringing the enemy spies to justice.

Cast
 Patrick Allen – John Lane 
 Jacqueline Ellis – Mary 
 James Maxwell – Ray Ellis 
 Zena Walker – Annette Lane 
 Ewan Roberts – Col. Burlinson 
 Jeffrey Segal – Dr. Lindt 
 Anne Padwick – Mrs. Lindt 
 Harold Goodwin – Edwards 
 John Bown – Mason 
 Sean Lynch – Porter 
 Jack May – Burton 
 Anton Rodgers - Curtis (agent posing as bookmaker)
 Mark Singleton – Venner

Critical reception
Britmovie called the film a "decent second feature espionage drama."

References

External links

1962 films
1960s thriller films
British thriller films
Films directed by Robert Tronson
Films shot at Pinewood Studios
1960s English-language films
1960s British films